is a shōjo manga series by Hideko Mizuno about the rise and fall of an American rock star named Aaron.  It was serialised in Seventeen from 1969–1971 and won the 1970 Shogakukan Manga Award.

Aaron Browning is an American teenager who gets sent to juvenile prison after being caught with a delinquent named Fire Wolf. He finds solace in music and later manages to sort-of bond with Fire Wolf himself, and he ultimately leaves to Detroit determined to make it in the musical industry. He leads a band named Fire! and seeks to lead people to freedom with their music.

The hedonistic Aaron is neither a 'boy next door' character, nor a 'shining prince', and Sandra Buckley states that it was his 'non-conventional, rebellious behavior' that was part of the attraction for the fans of Fire!.  It was innovative for shōjo manga by having the first sexually explicit scenes in post-World War II manga, and by having a male protagonist. The model for Aaron was Scott Walker of The Walker Brothers.

The story has been read as a "conservative morality tale", but Buckley states that this ignores the two-year run of readers following Aaron's exploits avidly.  There are accounts of teenage girls queueing for the next issue to come out.

References

Further reading

External links
E-books of Fire!

1969 manga
Shōjo manga
Winners of the Shogakukan Manga Award for general manga
Asahi Sonorama manga